Issakaba which is an anagram for Bakassi is a movie produced in the year 2001 by Lancelot Oduwa Imasuen, and it is based on true life events. It involves community vigilante boys called Bakassi Boys fighting against crimes like armed robbery and murder cases that put fear and panic in the community. It depicts also the battle against Eddy Nawgu a sorcerer that terrorized the people of Nawgu community in Anambra State.

Plot
The Issakaba boys led by Ebube had to fight against armed robbers who terrorize their society. The armed robbers possess certain mystical powers that they use in their robbery activities. Because of this, Ebube and his team of Issakaba boys also acquired powers that enable them to fight against robbery. The movie is full of action, horror and drama.

Cast
Sam Dede
Chiwetalu Agu
Pete Eneh 
Amaechi Muonagor 
Susan Obi 
Mike Ogundu
John Okafor
Andy Chukwu 
Zulu Adigwe 
Diewait Ikpechukwu
Remmy Ohajianya
Emeka Nwafor
Tom Njemanze
Uche Odoputa
Emeka Ani

References

External links

Igbo-language films
Nigerian films based on actual events
2000s vigilante films
Nigerian drama films
English-language Nigerian films
2000s English-language films